The Thin Man is a half-hour weekly television series based on the mystery novel The Thin Man (1933) by Dashiell Hammett. The 72 episodes were produced by MGM Television and broadcast by NBC for two seasons from 1957–1959 on Friday evening. It was the first TV series produced by MGM.

Overview
The series starred Peter Lawford and Phyllis Kirk as Nick and Nora Charles. The dog, Asta, was played by three identical wire-hair terriers. Jack Albertson, Patricia Donahue, and Nita Talbot had recurring roles during the show's second season. Albertson played Lieutenant Harry Evans of the New York Police Department. Donahue played Hazel, Nick and Nora's neighbor. Talbot played Beatrice Dane, alias Blondie Collins, a criminal who dragged Nick and Nora into her schemes. Both Hazel and Beatrice made attempts to seduce Nick. Nora's jealousy fueled her sarcasm on these occasions.

A newspaper columnist wrote that Nora Charles's role was different from that of other female leads in detective programs on television. Kirk commented:We were the first of the sophisticated detective dramas, and from the scripts it was simple to see that the part of Nora Charles was that of a leading lady who made more than token appearances. Since then some of the new shows just use girls as part of the scenery.

Among the series guest stars was Billy Gray, who appeared at the same time he was cast as James "Bud" Anderson, Jr., in Father Knows Best. Ann McCrea was cast as Billie in the 1958 episode, "The Lost Last Chapter". Of note is the "guest star" in the episode "Robot Client": the original Robby the Robot from the 1956 film Forbidden Planet. This episode is available as an extra on the Forbidden Planet DVD.

Ben Starr was the program's writer, while Sam Marx was the executive producer.

The series began airing on Sony's GetTV in March 2016.

Episode list

Season 1: 1957–58

Season 2: 1958–59

References

External links 

 

1950s American crime television series
1957 American television series debuts
1959 American television series endings
1950s American comedy-drama television series
American detective television series
Black-and-white American television shows
English-language television shows
Television shows based on American novels
Television series about marriage
Television series by MGM Television
Television shows set in New York City
Nick and Nora Charles